Sérgio Dávila (born São Paulo, 1965) is a Brazilian journalist, and the current editor-in-chief of Folha de S.Paulo, taking over the post after Maria Cristina Frias stayed on it for 7 months.

Career
Initially, he was a reporter for Revista da Folha. He then edited Ilustrada, a notebook focused on cultural issues, from 1996 to 2000. Later, he became an international correspondent for Folha de S.Paulo. He covered the Iraq War, winning the 2003 Esso Award with the book Diário de Bagdá – A Guerra do Iraque segundo os bombardeados.''

References 

Brazilian journalists
Male journalists
1965 births
Living people
20th-century Brazilian people